Dale Turner is an American singer-songwriter, rock musician, and multi-instrumentalist/record producer, noted for his sophisticated songcraft, quirky vocal arrangements, and adventurous guitar work. Queen-meets-Mr. Bungle-meets-Frank Zappa-like melodic rock, with somewhat psychedelic musical leanings.

Regarded as a musical "Renaissance man" and  "mad scientist" for his versatility as a self-recordist in the studio environment, Turner's overall artistic vision has been likened to Jon Brion, Sufjan Stevens, Todd Rundgren, Jeff Buckley, and the Beach Boys' Brian Wilson. Turner is the lone musician featured on all of his albums.

History

Awards and achievements
In November 2010, Dale Turner's Mannerisms Magnified CD made Guitar Player magazine's list of "Top Three Picks" by Matt Blackett, who praised the album for its "Smart pop tunes that are crammed with interesting guitar parts and tones," comparing it to "what the Beach Boys might do if they were on an acid trip that was on the verge of getting out of control. Yeah!"

On July 11, 2011, Dale Turner's Mannerisms Magnified album achieved No. 1 Top-Rated Album status on Amazon.com in four categories:

No.1 Top Rated in MP3 Albums > Rock (Singer-Songwriters)
No.1 Top Rated in MP3 Albums > Alternative Rock (Singer-Songwriters)
No.1 Top Rated in MP3 Albums > Alternative Rock (Indie & Lo-Fi)
No.1 Top Rated in MP3 Albums > Rock (Progressive)

A regular "acoustic guitar" content contributor to Guitar World magazine, and featured video performer, Turner was one of the first musicians/guitarists to be featured in Guitar World magazine's "Lick of the Day" App. for iPhone.

In 2006, Turner's guitar/vocal-only rendition of Queen's "Bohemian Rhapsody" was selected as one of the "Top Cover Song Recordings" at the Just Plain Folks Music Awards.

Radio
Dale Turner's's debut American radio broadcast was on "Appalachian Trail," Steve Sedberry's "Vaguely Folk Music" show on WUWG Radio 90.7 FM, broadcast August 24, 2004; Sedberry played Turner's cover versions of Queen's "Bohemian Rhapsody" and Harry Nilsson's "Coconut."

In addition to terrestrial radio, Turner's music also appears on Pandora Radio.

Discography

LPs
 Interpretations (2004)
"Bohemian Rhapsody"
"God Only Knows"
"Blackbird"
"Sweet Baby James"
"Hallelujah"
"She's Always a Woman"
"Leader of the Band"
"Sister Golden Hair"
"Castles Made of Sand"
"Coconut"

Mannerisms Magnified (2010)
"Brian on the Brain"
"Bad Seed"
"Sooner or Later You'll Hate Her"
"She-Hab"
"Hiding Place"
"Taken"
"Morality Rule"
"Five Things"
"Saboteur"
"Civil Lies"
"Exit Wound"
"Solace Song"

References

External links
Official website
G3 MAGAZINE Interview: Dale Turner – Mannerisms Magnified
ALTSOUNDS Interview: THE LOWDOWN – DALE TURNER
MUSIC ZEITGEIST's October 2011 Indie Artist of the Month
TARGET AUDIENCE MAGAZINE Featured Indie Artist: What We All Can Learn from Dale Turner
I AM ENTERTAINMENT Magazine Interview: Making Music the 'Dale Way'
INDIE MUSIC DIGEST Interview: Dale Turner – Mannerisms Magnified
JUNIOR'S CAVE Interview: Music Now Spotlight
ULTIMATE-GUITAR.COM Interview: "Stepping Outside Yourself ... Only Way to Grow as Musician"
GUITARHOO.COM Interview: Dale Turner"

American singer-songwriters
American rock songwriters
American rock singers
American indie pop musicians
American multi-instrumentalists
American rock guitarists
Place of birth missing (living people)
Year of birth missing (living people)
American male guitarists
American experimental musicians
American male composers
21st-century American composers
Record producers from California
Living people
21st-century American male musicians
American male singer-songwriters